Marc Battier (born 21 December 1947) is a French composer and musicologist.

Battier was born in Brive-la-Gaillarde, France. He is known as a co-founder with Leigh Landy and Daniel Teruggi of the Electroacoustic Music Studies Network, which established a new field in musicology specifically for the musicological study of electroacoustic music. He is also known for developing the study of electroacoustic music in East Asia. His electroacoustic are widely performed and have been commissioned in several countries.

He teaches at the Paris-Sorbonne University (1997–present) and has taught at the University of California, San Diego and at UC Irvine. He has been in residence at the Aichi University of Fine Arts and Music in Nagoya (Aichi gedai, Japan), and was invited professor at the Université de Montréal (Canada). He was DAAD Varese Guestprofessor in Berlin (April–July 2012) and then in residence at Aichi Prefectural University of Fine Arts and Music (July 2012, Japan). As a full professor, he is the head of a research team, MINT (Musicologie, informatique et nouvelles technologies) which spearhead the field of electroacoustic music studies. This new field became formed when Battier and Leigh Landy, professor at De Montfort University, joined forces to found an international conference, first held in 2003 at Centre Georges Pompidou in Paris with the support of IRCAM. With Daniel Teruggi, composer and head of Groupe de recherches musicales, INA-GRM, they formed the electroacoustic music studies network, a non-profit association which since then helps organize an annual conference (2005, Montreal, Canada; 2006: Beijing, China; 2007: Leicester, UK; 2008: Paris, France; 2009: Buenos Aires; 2010: Shanghai, China; 2011: New York, USA; 2012: Stockholm; 2013: Lisbon; 2014: Berlin; 2015: Sheffield). Battier is one of the main experts on electroacoustic music and computer music history. He has written many articles on that topic and has published several books. He is the co-founder, with professor Leigh Landy (De Montfort University) and later Daniel Teruggi (INA-GRM) of the Electroacoustic Music Studies (EMS) movement (founded, 2003), which led to the creation of the annual EMS conference. He is also a leader of the musicology of electroacoustic music in East Asia (EMSAN project), which led to the creation of databases of electroacoustic music in East Asia.

In 2015, he was asked by the Suzhou Academy of Music (China) to help develop its electroacoustic music program. He is also Supervisor for the Planetary Collegium (Plymouth University) doctoral program for the DeTao-node in Shanghai.

Musicology
After some short studies of architecture at the École nationale supérieure des Beaux-Arts in Paris, Battier chose to focus on electroacoustic and contemporary music. He received his PhD in 1981 at the University of Paris X Nanterre in esthetics. Later, he passed the Habilitation à diriger des recherches in musicology, a higher education diploma requested to be able to become a professor and be the adviser of doctoral candidates in France.

He cofounded the Electroacoustic Music Studies (EMS) conference with Leigh Landy in 2003 and the Electroacoustic Music Studies Network with Leigh Landy and Daniel Teruggi in 2005.

He founded in 2007 and is the current president of the Electroacoustic Music Studies Asia Network association (EMSAN).

Career

Battier has been invited to teach in various universities: at Paris 8 University as a lecturer for many years, the University of California, San Diego, from 1984 to 1986, the Université de Montréal (2008), the University of California, Irvine (2009), and the Aichi Prefectural University of Fine Arts and Music (Japan, 2009, and 2018). Assistant to John Cage (Paris, 1970).

He was hired by IRCAM from 1979 to 2002 as a teacher, musical assistant and executive. There, he worked as musical assistant with many prominent composers: Steve Reich, Pierre Henry, Pierre Boulez, (Karlheinz Stockhausen (for "Kathinka's Gesang"), Joji Yuasa (for Nine Levels by Ze-Ami), Philippe Manoury (for Jupiter).

He has composed electroacoustic music since 1970 and started to use computers for composition (1970), for control of analogue EMS VCS3 synthesizers (1973), and for sound synthesis (MUSIC V: Geométrie d'Hiver, 1978). He has written many pieces for electroacoustic sounds, processed voices and electronic sounds often mixed with live instruments.

In 2013, he became "Electroacoustic Music Master" at the Beijing DeTao Masters Academy, a creativity-oriented Institute of higher education located at the Shanghai Institute of Visual Art in Shanghai and, in 2015, he was selected to be a Supervisor for doctoral dissertations at the Planetary Collegium, DeTao branch, Shanghai.

Since 2014, he is a Global Associate of the New Music World organization in New York. In 2015, New York University asked him to give private composition lessons in music technology at NYU Paris. Also in 2015, he started a long-term collaboration with Suzhou Academy of Music (China) to develop an electroacoustic music graduate program.
In 2017, hired by New York University, New York, to give a computer music workshop with prof. Taehong park, August. From April to August 2018, he taught the Aichi University of the Arts, Nagakute (Japan).

He has published several CDs: Transparence (CD BOND AGE BRCD 9595), released in 1995, received these comments from Larry Wendt in Computer Music Journal:
Possibilities of work between sound poets and musicians have recently been reexamined, however, in a new collaborative CD titled Transparence. This is a collection of acoustical landscapes by composer Marc Battier. The sounds used in the compositions have all been rendered from a single fragment of a sound poem by Henri Chopin. ... As it is essentially stated in the liner notes, Marc Battier's works are translations of Henri Chopin's sound poetry into music. ... Marc Battier has translated Henri Chopin's studies of condensed temporal motion into lush spatial landscapes evocative of multiple horizons in Japan's composed and natural countryside. ... Marc Battier has maintained a high degree of symmetry and resonance with Henri Chopin's ideological sources in Transparence, and has extended a way of working into more non-obvious realms of investigation.

Of the same CD, Transparence, Jim Aikin wrote in his "In Review" column of Keyboard, "Throbbing drones and buzzes, shimmering pitch sweeps, blurps and whistles, thick chords that hang suspended in space. No beat, no harmony, no presets playing riffs, just pure molten layers of digital sound poured out like gorgeous lava [...] his results are sensual and evocative if Apollonian; curtains of tone billow in a chilly dreamscape".

His piece for brass quintet and 4-channel tape, an IRCAM commission, was performed at the 1984 Paris ICMC. Hubert Howe wrote about it that it was a "subtle and successful piece" (Perspectives of New Music 1985).

Prizes and commissions
 2016, China national plan "1000 Talents", Expert category
 2014, DeTao Master Professor Marc Battier received an award for Outstanding Contribution to Musicacoustica-Beijing on October 26, 2014, Beijing (China).
 1984–1985, winner, "Villa Medicis hors les murs", ministry of Foreign Affairs, one-year stay in California.
 Commissions from French National Centre for Scientific Research, 1978, Japan (1981, 1993, 2012), Bourges Festival of experimental music (1983), IRCAM (1984), Massachusetts Arts Council (USA) (1985), French State (Commande d'Etat), 1989, China (2006, 2009, 2010, 2011), Groupe de recherches musicales, INA-GRM (2008, 2012), DAAD for Technische Universität Berlin, Northeastern University (2012), Salamanca Electroacoustic Music Festival, Gifu, Japan (2015).

Affiliations
 Société asiatique
 Société des Études Japonaises
 Réseau Asie, CNRS
 Collège de ’Pataphysique

He is on the board of:
 Organised Sound (Cambridge University Press)
 Malaysian Music Journal (Faculty of Music and Performing Arts, Sultan Idris Education University, Malaysia)
 International Journal of Sound, Music and Technology (IJSMT, Taiwan)
 Leonardo (2012–), honorary editor
 Leonardo Music Journal (1992–2011, MIT Press)
 Computer Music Journal (1980–1996, MIT Press)

Some publications
 Pierre Barbaud. Correspondance, Battier, M., L. Claass et N. Viel (dir.), Paris, Delatour, 2011.
Entries for The Grove Dictionary of American Music, 2nd edition, New York, Oxford University Press, 2011.
 "Messiaen and his collaborative musique concrète rhythmic study"', in Olivier Messiaen : the Centenary Papers, sous la dir. de Judith Crispin, Newcastle upon Tyne, Cambridge Scholars Publishing, 2010, p. 1–27
 Timbres-Durées d'Olivier Messiaen : une oeuvre entre conception abstraite et matériaux concret, Paris, Groupe de recherches musicales et Institut national de l'audiovisuel, 2008.
 "Phonography and Invention of Sound", in Philosophical Reflections on Recorded Music, Mine Dogatan-Dack, ed., London, Middlesex University Press, 2008, p. 99–115
 Musique et informatique, une bibliographie indexée, Paris, Elmeratto, CNRS, 1978. Review at Bibliothèque nationale de France

Recent works
 Recollections, for orchestra and tape, Commission of the Second Asia-Europe Festival and the 34th Asian Composers League Festival & Conference, Hanoi, Vietnam, 2016 (Vietnam National Symphony Orchestra, Honna Tetsuji, conductor). Of Recollections, Andrián Pertout wrote: "Highlights of the concert included Marc Battier's (France) Recollections for orchestra – a stunningly beautiful gestural work with an electroacoustic component that delicately layered the orchestra with a collection of subtle overtones".
 Proxima, for vibraphone, percussions and electroacoustic sounds, Commission of the Musicacoustica Festival, Beijing, China, 2016. Thierry Miroglio, perc.
 Rainwater, for orchestra, Commission of Asuza Pacific University Symphony Orchestra, Asuza (California), 2014 (Christopher Russell, conductor).
 7 metamorphoses, percussion, poet and electroacoustic sounds on 8 channels, 26 minutes, INA-GRM commission, Paris, Maison de radio France, May 11, 2013. Poet: Zeno Bianu. Percussions: Thierry Miroglio. Beijing version, October 2013: 4 metamorphoses
 Constellations for guzheng, guzheng and electroacoustic sounds, Liu Jing, guzheng, CCOM Concert Hall, Beijing, October 2012.
 Constellations for koto, koto and electroacoustic sounds, Naoko Kikuchi, koto, St. Elisabeth-Kirche; "Nacht Klang" concert, Berlin, August 2012.
 I Gysin, for pipa and electronic sounds, written for Min Xiao Fen, Boston, September 2012..
 Constellation Sketches, for koto (13 strings) and electroacoustic sounds, Yoko Nomura, koto, Kaze no Hall, Nagakute, Japan, July 2012.
 Dans l'Atelier du Peintre, 8-channel tape, commission of DAAD for Technische Universität Berlin, January 2012, Berlin.
 Double suns, for violin and electronic sounds, written for Mari Kimura, Beijing, 2011.
 Conversaciones, for guqin, poet, laptop and electronic sounds (Musicacoustica festival, Beijing, 2010)
 Mist on a Hill, for pipa and electronic sounds (Musicacoustica festival, Beijing, 2009); on Mist on Hill, see: 
 Bird of the capital (Miyako dori), for shakuhachi, voice and processed voice, (INA-GRM commission, Paris, 2008).

References

Sources

External links
 "Marc Battier", Composer Profiles, Kalvos & Damian
 
 CV Sorbonne University
 CDemusic.org
 Musiquecontemporaine.fr
 Marc Battier's biography on Cdmc website

French classical composers
French male classical composers
Living people
1947 births
20th-century classical composers
21st-century classical composers
People from Brive-la-Gaillarde
Academic staff of Paris-Sorbonne University
Academic staff of Paris 8 University Vincennes-Saint-Denis
University of California, San Diego faculty
University of California, Irvine faculty
20th-century French composers
21st-century French composers
20th-century French male musicians
21st-century French male musicians